Vexillum jackylenae is a species of small sea snail, marine gastropod mollusk in the family Costellariidae, the ribbed miters.

References 

 Salisbury R. & Guillot de Suduiraut E. (2006) Five new Costellariidae from the Philippine Islands taken by tangle net fisherman (Gastropoda: Muricoidea: Costellariidae). Visaya 1(6): 90-103. [October 2006] page(s): 96

Gastropods described in 2006
jackylenae